Myrlaea albistrigata is a species of snout moth. It is found in France and Turkey.

References

Moths described in 1881
Phycitini
Moths of Europe
Insects of Turkey
Taxa named by Otto Staudinger